The Green Pack is a 1934 British drama film directed by T. Hayes Hunter and starring John Stuart, Aileen Marson and Hugh Miller. It was based on a play of the same name by Edgar Wallace. In the film, the wealthy investor in a South African gold mine is found murdered with several obvious suspects for the crime.

Cast
 John Stuart - Larry Dean 
 Aileen Marson - Joan Thurston 
 Hugh Miller - Martin Creet 
 Garry Marsh - Tubby Storman 
 Michael Shepley - Mark Elliott 
 J.H. Roberts - Doctor Thurston 
 Anthony Holles - Inspector Aguilar 
 Percy Walsh - Monty Carr

References

External links

1934 films
1934 drama films
British films based on plays
Films based on works by Edgar Wallace
Films directed by T. Hayes Hunter
British drama films
British black-and-white films
1930s English-language films
1930s British films